The Trikāya doctrine (lit. "three bodies";) is a Mahayana Buddhist teaching on both the nature of reality and the nature of Buddhahood. The doctrine says that Buddha has three kāyas or bodies, the Dharmakāya (ultimate reality), the Saṃbhogakāya (divine incarnation of Buddha), and the Nirmāṇakāya (physical incarnation of Buddha).

Definition
The doctrine says that a Buddha has three kāyas or bodies:
 The Dharmakāya, "Dharma body," ultimate reality, "pure being itself," Buddha nature, emptiness, it is usually associated with Vairocana;
 The Saṃbhogakāya, "Enjoyment (or Bliss) body," the divine Buddhas of the Buddha realms, it is usually associated with Amitabha;
 The Nirmāṇakāya, "Transformation (or Appearance) Body," physical appearance in the world, it is usually associated with Gautama.

Origins
The Dharmakāya doctrine was possibly first expounded in the Aṣṭasāhasrikā Prajñāpāramitā "The Perfection of Wisdom In Eight Thousand Verses", composed in the 1st century BCE. Mahayana Buddhism introduced the Sambhogakāya, which conceptually fits between the Nirmāṇakāya (the manifestations of enlightenment in the physical world) and the Dharmakaya. Around 300 CE, the Yogacara school systematized the prevalent ideas on the nature of the Buddha in the Trikaya or three-body doctrine.

Interpretation in Buddhist traditions
Various Buddhist traditions have different ideas about what the three bodies are.

Chinese Buddhism
The Three Bodies of the Buddha consists of:

 The Nirmaṇakāya, which is a physical/manifest body of a Buddha. An example would be Gautama Buddha's body.
 The Sambhogakāya, which is the reward/enjoyment body, whereby a bodhisattva completes his vows and becomes a Buddha. Amitābha, Vajrasattva and Manjushri are examples of Buddhas with the Sambhogakaya body.
 The Dharmakāya, which is the embodiment of the truth itself, and it is commonly seen as transcending the forms of physical and spiritual bodies. Vairocana Buddha is often depicted as the Dharmakāya in the Chinese Esoteric Buddhist and Huayan traditions.

As with earlier Buddhist thought, all three forms of the Buddha teach the same Dharma, but take on different forms to expound the truth. 

According to Schloegl, in the Zhenzhou Linji Huizhao Chansi Yulu (which is a Chan Buddhist compilation), the Three Bodies of the Buddha are not taken as absolute. They would be "mental configurations" that "are merely names or props" and would only perform a role of light and shadow of the mind.

The Zhenzhou Linji Huizhao Chansi Yulu advises:

Japanese Buddhism

Tibetan Buddhism

Three Vajras
The Three Vajras, namely "body, speech and mind", are a formulation within Vajrayana Buddhism and Bon that hold the full experience of the śūnyatā "emptiness" of Buddha-nature, void of all qualities and marks and establish a sound experiential key upon the continuum of the path to enlightenment. The Three Vajras correspond to the trikaya and therefore also have correspondences to the Three Roots and other refuge formulas of Tibetan Buddhism. The Three Vajras are viewed in twilight language as a form of the Three Jewels, which imply purity of action, speech and thought.

The Three Vajras are often mentioned in Vajrayana discourse, particularly in relation to samaya, the vows undertaken between a practitioner and their guru during empowerment. The term is also used during Anuttarayoga Tantra practice.

The Three Vajras are often employed in tantric sādhanā at various stages during the visualization of the generation stage, refuge tree, guru yoga and iṣṭadevatā processes. The concept of the Three Vajras serves in the twilight language to convey polysemic meanings, aiding the practitioner to conflate and unify the mindstream of the iṣṭadevatā, the guru and the sādhaka in order for the practitioner to experience their own Buddha-nature.

Speaking for the Nyingma tradition, Tulku Urgyen Rinpoche perceives an identity and relationship between Buddha-nature, dharmadhatu, dharmakāya, rigpa and the Three Vajras: 

Robert Beer (2003: p. 186) states:

The bīja corresponding to the Three Vajras are: a white om (enlightened body), a red ah (enlightened speech) and a blue hum (enlightened mind).

Simmer-Brown (2001: p. 334) asserts that:
 This explicates the semiotic rationale for the nomenclature of the somatic discipline called trul khor.

The triple continua of body-voice-mind are intimately related to the Dzogchen doctrine of "sound, light and rays" as a passage of the rgyud bu chung bcu gnyis kyi don bstan pa ('The Teaching on the Meaning of the Twelve Child Tantras') rendered into English by Rossi (1999: p. 65) states (Tibetan provided for probity):

Barron et al. (1994, 2002: p. 159), renders from Tibetan into English, a terma "pure vision" of Sri Singha by Dudjom Lingpa that describes the Dzogchen state of 'formal meditative equipoise'  (Tibetan: nyam-par zhag-pa) which is the indivisible fulfillment of vipaśyanā and śamatha, Sri Singha states:

Buddha-bodies
Vajrayana sometimes refers to a fourth body called the svābhāvikakāya "essential body", and to a fifth body, called the mahāsūkhakāya ("great bliss body"). The svābhāvikakāya is simply the unity or non-separateness of the three kayas. The term is also known in Gelug teachings, where it is one of the assumed two aspects of the dharmakāya: svābhāvikakāya "essence body" and jñānakāya "body of wisdom". Haribhadra claims that the Abhisamayalankara describes Buddhahood through four kāyas in chapter 8: svābhāvikakāya, [jñāna]dharmakāya, sambhogakāya and nirmāṇakāya.

In dzogchen teachings, "dharmakaya" means the buddha-nature's absence of self-nature, that is, its emptiness of a conceptualizable essence, its cognizance or clarity is the sambhogakaya, and the fact that its capacity is 'suffused with self-existing awareness' is the nirmanakaya.

The interpretation in Mahamudra is similar: When the mahamudra practices come to fruition, one sees that the mind and all phenomena are fundamentally empty of any identity; this emptiness is called dharmakāya. One perceives that the essence of mind is empty, but that it also has a potentiality that takes the form of luminosity. In Mahamudra thought, Sambhogakāya is understood to be this luminosity. Nirmanakāya is understood to be the powerful force with which the potentiality affects living beings.

In the view of Anuyoga, the Mind Stream (Sanskrit: citta santana) is the 'continuity' (Sanskrit: santana; Wylie: rgyud) that links the Trikaya. The Trikāya, as a triune, is symbolised by the Gankyil.

Dakinis
A ḍākinī ( khandro[ma]) is a tantric deity described as a female embodiment of enlightened energy. The Sanskrit term is likely related to the term for drumming, while the Tibetan term means "sky goer" and may have originated in the Sanskrit khecara, a term from the Cakrasaṃvara Tantra.

Ḍākinīs can also be classified according to the trikāya theory. The dharmakāya ḍākinī, which is Samantabhadrī, represents the dharmadhatu where all phenomena appear. The sambhogakāya ḍākinī are the yidams used as meditational deities for tantric practice. The nirmanakaya ḍākinīs are human women born with special potentialities; these are realized yogini, the consorts of the gurus, or even all women in general as they may be classified into the families of the Five Tathagatas.

See also

Aniconism in Buddhism
Buddharupa
Leela attitude
Maravijaya attitude
Meditation attitude
Naga Prok attitude
Nāma & Rūpa
Physical characteristics of the Buddha
Rainbow body
Refuge in Buddhism
Relics associated with Buddha

Notes

References

Sources
Printed sources

 

 

 
 
 
 

 

Web sources

Further reading
 Radich, Michael (2007). Problems and Opportunities in the Study of the Bodies of the Buddha, New Zealand Journal of Asian Studies 9 (1), 46-69
 Radich, Michael (2010). Embodiments of the Buddha in Sarvâstivāda Doctrine: With Special Reference to the Mahavibhāṣā. Annual Report of the International Research Institute for Advanced Buddhology 13, 121-172

External links 
 Trikaya del Saya Kunsal Kassapa 
trikāya - A Dictionary of Buddhism
Khandro: The Three Kayas
Kagyu: The Three Kayas
32 marks of the Buddha ("THIRTY TWO MARKS OF A GREAT MAN")
Trikaya - The Three Bodies of a Buddha or Learning to Love

Buddhist philosophical concepts
Vajrayana
Sanskrit words and phrases